Senator Gregory may refer to:

Greg Gregory (born 1963), South Carolina State Senate
Isaac Gregory (died 1800), North Carolina State Senator
Sara Beth Gregory (born 1982), Kentucky State Senate
Vincent Gregory (born 1948), Michigan State Senate

See also
Senator Gregorio (disambiguation)